The Baguio–Bua–Itogon National Road (alternatively the Baguio–Bua–Itogon–Dalupirip National Road, or simply Baguio-Bua-Itogon Road) is a  major highway in northern Luzon that runs from the city of Baguio to the municipality of Itogon in the province of Benguet.

It serves as an important route for accessing the mining town of Itogon, particularly six of its barangays (Tuding, Gumatdang, Ucab, Poblacion (Central), Tinongdan, and Dalupirip).

The highway's west terminus begins from a junction with Leonard Wood Road. Its east end lies in the mid-area of the large southern barangay of Dalupirip, just beside the Agno River.

Within the Philippine highway network, the entire highway is designated as an unnumbered national tertiary road.

See also
 Highways in the Philippines

References

Roads in Benguet
Baguio